The 2013–14 Maltese First Division (also known as 2013–14 BOV 1st Division due to sponsorship reasons) began on 13 September 2013 and ended on 27 April 2014.

Participating teams
These teams will contest the 2013–14 Maltese First Division season:
 Birżebbuġa St. Peter's
 Gudja United
 Gżira United
 Ħamrun Spartans
 Lija Athletic
 Melita
 Msida Saint-Joseph
 Pietà Hotspurs
 St. Andrews
 St. George's
 Żebbuġ Rangers
 Żejtun Corinthians
 Żurrieq

Changes from previous season
 Naxxar Lions and Vittoriosa Stars were promoted to the 2013–14 Maltese Premier League. They were replaced with Melita and Ħamrun Spartans, relegated from 2012–13 Maltese Premier League.
Dingli Swallows and Mqabba were relegated to the 2013–14 Maltese Second Division. They were replaced with Żebbuġ Rangers, Msida Saint-Joseph, St. George's and Żurrieq all promoted from 2012–13 Maltese Second Division.
Marsaxlokk were relegated to the 2013–14 Maltese Third Division since finding financial difficulties.

Final league table

Results

Top scorers

References

External links
 Pieta Crowned Champions  
 Zebbug Rangers Promoted 
 Zejtun Relegated 
 Hamrun Spartans Relegated

Maltese First Division seasons
Malta
2